Sedrick Barefield (born November 18, 1996) is a Filipino-American professional basketball player. He played college basketball for the SMU Mustangs and the Utah Utes.

College career
Barefield college basketball for the SMU Mustangs before transferring to Utah. As a senior at Utah, he averaged 16.8 points, 3.8 assists and 2.1 rebounds per game.

Professional career
After going undrafted in the 2019 NBA draft, Barefield signed with the Oklahoma City Thunder of the National Basketball Association (NBA) for NBA Summer League. He subsequently joined the Oklahoma City Blue of the NBA G League. Barefield posted 29 points, one rebound, one assist and one steal in a 149–117 win over the Stockton Kings on January 17, 2020. He averaged 9.0 points, 1.4 rebounds and 1.4 assists per game, shooting 39 percent from behind the arc. On July 16, 2020, he signed with Nevėžis Kėdainiai of the Lithuanian Basketball League.

On February 27, 2022, Barefield was reacquired by the Oklahoma City Blue.

In May 2022, he declared for the PBA Season 47 draft.

On September 8, 2022, Barefield signed with the Taipei Fubon Braves of the P. League+.

On October 11, 2022, Barefield signed with the Tainan TSG GhostHawks of the T1 League.

On February 7, 2023, it was reported that Barefield signed with the Bay Area Dragons of the East Asia Super League as their Asian import.

Personal life
Barefield is of Filipino descent through his mother. He became a Filipino citizen prior to joining the PBA Season 47 draft.

References

External links
Utah Utes bio

1996 births
Living people
American expatriate basketball people in Greece
American expatriate basketball people in Lithuania
American men's basketball players
American sportspeople of Filipino descent
Basketball players from California
BC Nevėžis players
Citizens of the Philippines through descent
Filipino men's basketball players
Oklahoma City Blue players
Tainan TSG GhostHawks players
T1 League Asian imports
Point guards
SMU Mustangs men's basketball players
Sportspeople from Corona, California
Utah Utes men's basketball players
Bay Area Dragons players